Mats Deijl (born 15 July 1997) is a Dutch professional footballer who plays as a right back for Eredivisie club Go Ahead Eagles.

Club career
He made his professional debut in the Eerste Divisie for FC Den Bosch on 16 December 2016 in a game against Fortuna Sittard and was added to the Den Bosch first team squad a few weeks later. On 4 January 2017, the club announced that Deijl had been permanently promoted to first team.

On 16 June 2021, Deijl signed a three-year contract with recently promoted Eredivisie club Go Ahead Eagles.

References

External links
 

1997 births
Living people
People from Vlaardingen
Association football defenders
Dutch footballers
FC Den Bosch players
Go Ahead Eagles players
Eredivisie players
Eerste Divisie players
Footballers from South Holland